Since You Went Away is a 1944 American film directed by John Cromwell. 

Since You Went Away may also refer to:

"Since You Went Away", a song by the Monkees from the album Pool It!
"Since You Went Away", a song by Slaughter and the Dogs from the album Do It Dog Style
"Since You Went AWay", a song by the Stranglers released as a B-side to the album Dreamtime